The 2010 Cyprus Women's Cup was the third edition of the Cyprus Women's Cup, an invitational women's football tournament held annually in Cyprus.

Group stage

Group A

Group B

Knockout stage

Seventh place match

Fifth place match

Third place match

Final

Champion

Goalscorers
4 goals
 Manon Melis
 Amber Hearn

3 goals

 Christina Julien
 Sylvia Smit
 Lara Dickenmann

2 goals

 Alex Scott
 Ramona Bachmann
 Noko Matlou 

1 goal

 Kendra Flock
 Diana Matheson
 Christine Sinclair
 Lianne Sanderson
 Jill Scott
 Casey Stoney
 Faye White
 Elisa Camporese
 Giulia Domenichetti
 Carolina Pini
 Alessia Tuttino
 Anouk Hoogendijk
 Marlous Pieëte
 Kirsten van de Ven
 Anna Green
 Suzanne Grant
 Hayley Lauder
 Kim Little
 Mamphase Popela

Own goals
 Rachel Brown (playing against Italy)
 Janine Van Wyk (playing against Switzerland)

References

External links
RSSSF

2010
2010 in women's association football
2009–10 in Cypriot football